Nikolai Ignatovich Kondratenko (16 February 1940 – 23 November 2013) was a Russian politician, long time Governor of Krasnodar Krai, runner-up candidate of the Communist Party (CPRF) in 2003. Kondratenko was criticized for public antisemitic statements.

Kondratenko was a Governor of Krasnodar Krai from 1997 to 2001, a position in which he was preceded by Nikolai Yegorov, and succeeded by Alexander Tkachov.

He was known for his promotion of traditional values and a Cossack cultural revival.

He died on 23 November 2013.

References

1940 births
2013 deaths
People from Dinskoy District
Communist Party of the Russian Federation members
Communist Party of the Soviet Union members
Fourth convocation members of the State Duma (Russian Federation)
Members of the Federation Council of Russia (1994–1996)
Members of the Federation Council of Russia (1996–2000)
Members of the Federation Council of Russia (after 2000)

Governors of Krasnodar Krai
Recipients of the Order "For Merit to the Fatherland", 4th class
Recipients of the Order of the Red Banner of Labour
Russian communists
Deaths from stomach cancer